Michael Spencer, Baron Spencer of Alresford is a businessman.

Michael or Mike Spencer may also refer to:

Mike Spencer, record producer
Mike Spencer, one of the characters in True Blood
Michael Shane Spencer (born 1972), Major League Baseball outfielder